Hermosa is an unincorporated community in La Plata County, Colorado, United States. It is located north of Durango along U.S. Highway 550.

History
The community was established around 1874 and had a post office from 1876 to 1900. Residents are now served by post offices in Durango.

In 2018, the 416 Fire burned northwest of Hermosa, prompting evacuations.

Attractions
The Durango and Silverton Narrow Gauge Railroad has a water stop in Hermosa, and the railroad maintains a maintenance yard and a siding there, which is sometimes called the Hermosa Depot. The yard has a prominent railroad water tank that is easily seen by motorists passing through Hermosa on Highway 550. 

Hermosa Creek passes through the community from west to east and has its confluence with the Animas River nearby.

The Hermosa Cliffs, formed of red sandstone, line the river valley in Hermosa.

See also

 Durango Micropolitan Statistical Area

References

External links

Unincorporated communities in La Plata County, Colorado
Unincorporated communities in Colorado